Leucascus is a genus of sponges belonging to the family Leucascidae.

The species of this genus are found in Southern Hemisphere.

Species:

Leucascus albus 
Leucascus clavatus 
Leucascus digitiformis 
Leucascus flavus 
Leucascus leptoraphis 
Leucascus lobatus 
Leucascus neocaledonicus 
Leucascus protogenes 
Leucascus roseus 
Leucascus schleyeri 
Leucascus simplex

References

Clathrinida
Sponge genera